The black swan theory or theory of black swan events is a metaphor that describes an event that comes as a surprise, has a major effect, and is often inappropriately rationalized after the fact with the benefit of hindsight. The term is based on an ancient saying that presumed black swans did not exist a saying that became reinterpreted to teach a different lesson after they were discovered in Australia.

The theory was developed by Nassim Nicholas Taleb, starting in 2001, to explain:
 The disproportionate role of high-profile, hard-to-predict, and rare events that are beyond the realm of normal expectations in history, science, finance, and technology.
 The non-computability of the probability of consequential rare events using scientific methods (owing to the very nature of small probabilities).
 The psychological biases that blind people, both individually and collectively, to uncertainty and the substantial role of rare events in historical affairs.

Taleb's "black swan theory" refers only to unexpected events of large magnitude and consequence and their dominant role in history. Such events, considered extreme outliers, collectively play vastly larger roles than regular occurrences. More technically, in the scientific monograph "Silent Risk", Taleb mathematically defines the black swan problem as "stemming from the use of degenerate metaprobability".

Background

The phrase "black swan" derives from a Latin expression; its oldest known occurrence is from the 2nd-century Roman poet Juvenal's characterization in his Satire VI of something being "rara avis in terris nigroque simillima cygno" ("a rare bird in the lands and very much like a black swan"). When the phrase was coined, the black swan was presumed not to exist. The importance of the metaphor lies in its analogy to the fragility of any system of thought.  A set of conclusions is potentially undone once any of its fundamental postulates is disproved. In this case, the observation of a single black swan would be the undoing of the logic of any system of thought, as well as any reasoning that followed from that underlying logic.

Juvenal's phrase was a common expression in 16th century London as a statement of impossibility. The London expression derives from the Old World presumption that all swans must be white because all historical records of swans reported that they had white feathers. In that context, a black swan was impossible or at least nonexistent.

However, in 1697, Dutch explorers led by Willem de Vlamingh became the first Europeans to see black swans, in Western Australia. The term subsequently metamorphosed to connote the idea that a perceived impossibility might later be disproven. Taleb notes that in the 19th century, John Stuart Mill used the black swan logical fallacy as a new term to identify falsification.

Black swan events were discussed by Nassim Nicholas Taleb in his 2001 book Fooled By Randomness, which concerned financial events. His 2007 book The Black Swan extended the metaphor to events outside of financial markets. Taleb regards almost all major scientific discoveries, historical events, and artistic accomplishments as "black swans"—undirected and unpredicted.  He gives the rise of the Internet, the personal computer, World War I, the dissolution of the Soviet Union, and the September 11, 2001 attacks as examples of black swan events.

Taleb asserts:What we call here a Black Swan (and capitalize it) is an event with the following three attributes.

First, it is an outlier, as it lies outside the realm of regular expectations, because nothing in the past can convincingly point to its possibility. Second, it carries an extreme 'impact'. Third, in spite of its outlier status, human nature makes us concoct explanations for its occurrence after the fact, making it explainable and predictable.

I stop and summarize the triplet: rarity, extreme 'impact', and retrospective (though not prospective) predictability. A small number of Black Swans explains almost everything in our world, from the success of ideas and religions, to the dynamics of historical events, to elements of our own personal lives.

Identifying
Based on the author's criteria:
 The event is a surprise (to the observer).
 The event has a major effect.
 After the first recorded instance of the event, it is rationalized by hindsight, as if it could have been expected; that is, the relevant data were available but unaccounted for in risk mitigation programs.  The same is true for the personal perception by individuals.
According to Taleb, as it was expected with great certainty that a global pandemic would eventually take place, the COVID-19 pandemic is not a black swan, but is considered to be a white swan; such an event has a major effect, but is compatible with statistical properties.

Coping with black swans
The practical aim of Taleb's book is not to attempt to predict events which are unpredictable, but to build robustness against negative events while still exploiting positive events. Taleb contends that banks and trading firms are very vulnerable to hazardous black swan events and are exposed to unpredictable losses. On the subject of business, and quantitative finance in particular, Taleb critiques the widespread use of the normal distribution model employed in financial engineering, calling it a Great Intellectual Fraud.  Taleb elaborates the robustness concept as a central topic of his later book, Antifragile: Things That Gain From Disorder.

In the second edition of The Black Swan, Taleb provides "Ten Principles for a Black-Swan-Robust Society".

Taleb states that a black swan event depends on the observer.  For example, what may be a Black Swan surprise for a turkey is not a Black Swan surprise to its butcher; hence the objective should be to "avoid being the turkey" by identifying areas of vulnerability in order to "turn the Black Swans white".

Epistemological approach
Taleb's black swan is different from the earlier philosophical versions of the problem, specifically in epistemology, as it concerns a phenomenon with specific empirical and statistical properties which he calls, "the fourth quadrant".

Taleb's problem is about epistemic limitations in some parts of the areas covered in decision making. These limitations are twofold: philosophical (mathematical) and empirical (human-known) epistemic biases. The philosophical problem is about the decrease in knowledge when it comes to rare events because these are not visible in past samples and therefore require a strong a priori (extrapolating) theory; accordingly, predictions of events depend more and more on theories when their probability is small. In the "fourth quadrant", knowledge is uncertain and consequences are large, requiring more robustness.

According to Taleb, thinkers who came before him who dealt with the notion of the improbable (such as Hume, Mill, and Popper) focused on the problem of induction in logic, specifically, that of drawing general conclusions from specific observations. The central and unique attribute of Taleb's black swan event is that it is high-profile. His claim is that almost all consequential events in history come from the unexpected – yet humans later convince themselves that these events are explainable in hindsight. 

One problem, labeled the ludic fallacy by Taleb, is the belief that the unstructured randomness found in life resembles the structured randomness found in games. This stems from the assumption that the unexpected may be predicted by extrapolating from variations in statistics based on past observations, especially when these statistics are presumed to represent samples from a normal distribution. These concerns often are highly relevant in financial markets, where major players sometimes assume normal distributions when using value at risk models, although market returns typically have fat tail distributions.

Taleb said:I don't particularly care about the usual.  If you want to get an idea of a friend's temperament, ethics, and personal elegance, you need to look at him under the tests of severe circumstances, not under the regular rosy glow of daily life.  Can you assess the danger a criminal poses by examining only what he does on an ordinary day?  Can we understand health without considering wild diseases and epidemics?  Indeed the normal is often irrelevant. Almost everything in social life is produced by rare but consequential shocks and jumps; all the while almost everything studied about social life focuses on the 'normal,' particularly with 'bell curve' methods of inference that tell you close to nothing. Why? Because the bell curve ignores large deviations, cannot handle them, yet makes us confident that we have tamed uncertainty.  Its nickname in this book is GIF, Great Intellectual Fraud.More generally, decision theory, which is based on a fixed universe or a model of possible outcomes, ignores and minimizes the effect of events that are "outside the model". For instance, a simple model of daily stock market returns may include extreme moves such as Black Monday (1987), but might not model the breakdown of markets following the September 11, 2001 attacks.  Consequently, the New York Stock Exchange and Nasdaq exchange remained closed till September 17, 2001, the most protracted shutdown since the Great Depression. A fixed model considers the "known unknowns", but ignores the "unknown unknowns", made famous by a statement of Donald Rumsfeld. The term "unknown unknowns" appeared in a 1982 New Yorker article on the aerospace industry, which cites the example of metal fatigue, the cause of crashes in Comet airliners in the 1950s. 

Deterministic chaotic dynamics reproducing the Black Swan Event have been researched in economics. That is in agreement with Taleb's comment regarding some distributions which are not usable with precision, but which are more descriptive, such as the fractal, power law, or scalable distributions and that awareness of these might help to temper expectations. Beyond this, Taleb emphasizes that many events simply are without precedent, undercutting the basis of this type of reasoning altogether.

Taleb also argues for the use of counterfactual reasoning when considering risk.

See also

References

Bibliography
 .
 .
 The U.S. response to NEOs- avoiding a black swan event

External links
 .

Epistemological theories
Metatheory of science
Theory
Metaphors referring to birds
Nassim Nicholas Taleb